Erhürman cabinet was the government of Northern Cyprus between 2 February 2018 and 22 May 2019. It replaced the Özgürgün cabinet and consisted of 10 ministers formed by a coalition of the Republican Turkish Party (CTP), People's Party (HP), Communal Democracy Party (TDP) and Democratic Party (DP), which is a first in the history of TRNC cabinets. CTP got 4, HP got 3, TDP got 2 and DP got 2 ministers in the cabinet.

References 

Cabinets of Northern Cyprus